Le Cercle Rouge ("The Red Circle") is a 1970 crime film set mostly in Paris. It was directed by Jean-Pierre Melville and stars Alain Delon, Andre Bourvil, Gian Maria Volonté, François Périer and Yves Montand. It is known for its climactic heist sequence which is about half an hour in length and has almost no dialogue.

The film's title means "The Red Circle" and refers to the film's epigraph which translates as

Melville made up the quote, just as he did with the epigraph in Le Samouraï.

Plot
In Marseille, a prisoner named Corey is released early for good behaviour. Shortly before he leaves, a prison warden tips him off about a prestigious jewellery shop that he could rob in Paris. Corey goes to the house of Rico, a former associate who has let him down and with whom his former girlfriend now lives, and forcefully removes money and a handgun from Rico's safe. Then he goes to a billiard hall, where two of Rico's men find him. After killing one, knocking the other out and taking his gun, Corey buys a large American car and, hiding both handguns in the boot, starts for Paris. On the way up, listening to jazz and news on the radio, he encounters a police roadblock.

The same morning another prisoner, Vogel, who was being taken on a train from Marseille to Paris for interrogation by the well-respected Commissaire Mattei, manages to escape in open country. Vogel is pursued by and eludes Mattei, who orders roadblocks to be set and supervises the manhunt. Meanwhile, Corey, who has understood what this huge police activity is about, stops at a roadside grill in the epicentre of the manhunt, leaving his car boot unlocked. Vogel crosses a stream to send dogs off his scent, reaches the grill, and hides in the boot of Corey's car.

Corey, who has seen him and had been waiting for this, drives off into an open field and tells Vogel he can get out because he is safe. After a tense confrontation where Vogel waves one of Corey's guns, he realizes that Corey has just been released from prison that morning and is trying to save him. The two drive off with Vogel back in the boot. Shortly after, a car with two of Rico's men catches up and forces Corey off the road. They take him into the woods, take his money, and are about to kill him when Vogel, emerging from the boot with the guns, shoots both dead.

Corey takes Vogel to his empty flat in Paris where they start to plan the aforementioned robbery. For this they need a marksman to disable the security system by a single rifle shot and a fence to buy the goods. Meanwhile, Mattei is trying to locate the murderer of Rico's men and still trying to recapture Vogel. To do this, he puts pressure on Santi, a nightclub owner who knows most of the underworld, but who refuses to talk.

Corey recruits Jansen, an alcoholic ex-policeman and a crack shot, together with a fence. One long night, Corey, with Vogel and the support of Jansen, successfully rob the jewellery shop. However, the fence refuses to take the goods, having been warned off by a vengeful Rico, who had been told inadvertently by the prison warden from the beginning that Corey was on the job.

Overcoming their disappointment, Jansen and Vogel suggest that Corey ask Santi to recommend a new fence. Mattei blackmails Santi to obtain information about the meeting planned that evening at his nightclub, where Corey is supposed to meet the fence. Mattei, posing as the fence, asks Corey to bring the goods to a country house.

Corey does so, taking Jansen as backup and leaving Vogel at his apartment, who has been given the red rose that Corey had received from the flower girl at Santi's. After Corey arrives at the country house and starts showing the jewels to Mattei, Vogel appears from nowhere, presumably acting on his suspicion that Corey was not safe with this new fence, and tells Corey to run with the loot. After a brief, tense confrontation with Mattei, Vogel follows Corey. Jansen, alerted by the gunshots in the mansion's park now filled with police, arrives to stop the pursuants. One after the other, the three men are shot dead by Mattei's officers, who recover the jewels.

Cast
 Alain Delon as Corey
 André Bourvil as Inspector Mattei
 Gian Maria Volonté as Vogel
 Yves Montand as Jansen
 Paul Crauchet as the receiver
 Paul Amiot as Chief of Police
 Pierre Collet as prison guard
 André Ekyan as Rico
 Jean-Pierre Posier as Mattei's assistant
 François Périer as Santi (as François Perier)
 Yves Arcanel as committing magistrate 
 René Berthier as Judiciary Police Director
 Jean-Marc Boris as Jean-Marc Santi
 Jean Champion as level-crossing guard
 Yvan Chiffre as a policeman
 Anna Douking as Corey's old girlfriend (as Ana Douking)
 Mireille Darc as the flower girl in Santi's night club
 Robert Favart as Mauboussin's clerk
 Roger Fradet as a policeman
 Édouard Francomme as billiard hall watchman (as Edouard Francomme)
 Jean Franval as hotel receptionist
 Jacques Galland as train conductor
 Jean-Pierre Janic as Paul, Rico's henchman
 Pierre Lecomte as Internal Affairs Deputy
 Jacques Léonard as a policeman
 Jacques Leroy as a policeman
 Jean Pignol as court registry clerk
 Robert Rondo as a policeman

Reception

Box Office
It was the fifth most popular film of the year in France.

Critical
Vincent Canby, in a 1993 review of a 99-minute version dubbed into English, said the film "may baffle anyone coming upon [Melville] for the first time." According to Canby:
Though severely cut, The Red Circle doesn't exactly sweep along. It has a deliberate pace as Melville sets up the story of three chance acquaintances who plan and carry out the sacking of an elegant, supposedly impregnable jewelry store...Understatement is the method of the film, from Melville's pared-down screenplay to the performances by the three trenchcoated principals, even to the muted photography by Henri Decaë, which is in color but has the chilly effect of black and white.

Peter Bradshaw, in a 2003 review of a 102-minute reissue, called the film a "treat" and noted "Melville blends the Chandleresque world of his own devising with gritty French reality. With its taut silent robbery sequence, his movie gestures backwards to Rififi, and with Montand's specially modified bullets it anticipates Frederick Forsyth's Day of the Jackal and the contemporary techno-thriller."

Hong Kong director John Woo wrote an essay for the Criterion DVD of Le Cercle Rouge arguing the film's merits. When the film was given a theatrical re-release, Woo was given a "presenter" credit.

Roger Ebert gave the film four stars out of four in his 2003 review.

See also
Heist film

References

External links
 
 
 
 Le Cercle Rouge at Variety Distribution
 Le Cercle Rouge: Great Blasphemies an essay by Michael Sragow at the Criterion Collection
 Le cercle rouge: What Is the Red Circle? an essay by Chris Fujiwara at the Criterion Collection
 Between the Lines of Pure Cinema: The Red Circle essay by The Unstitute

1970s crime thriller films
1970 films
Films about alcoholism
Films directed by Jean-Pierre Melville
French crime thriller films
French heist films
Italian crime thriller films
French neo-noir films
Police detective films
Films produced by Robert Dorfmann
Films set in Paris
1970s heist films
1970s French-language films
1970s Italian films
1970s French films